Carlos Enrique Prado (born 1978) is a contemporary Cuban artist. He has worked in various artistic media such as sculpture, ceramics, drawing, digital art, performance, installations and interventions. Between 2002 and 2012, he was a professor at ISA University of Arts of Cuba (former Instituto Superior de Arte), where he was also the head of the sculpture program. He currently lives and works in Miami, Florida. He teaches ceramics and sculpture at the University of Miami, Coral Gables, Florida. He recently completed a major public sculpture, the Ronald Reagan Equestrian Monument, located in Tropical Park, Miami, commissioned by Miami-Dade County's Art in Public Places program.

Education 

 Master of Fine Art (Studio Art). ISA University of the Arts of Cuba (Instituto Superior de Arte), 2008.
 Bachelor of Fine Art in Sculpture. ISA, University of the Arts of Cuba, 2002.
 Graduated in Sculpture and Drawing at the San Alejandro National Academy of Fine Arts in Havana, 1996.

Teaching experience 
Carlos teaches at the University of Miami since 2014. He has specialized in teaching the human figure in clay and all the techniques of ceramics hand-building and wheel-throwing. He was an assistant professor of sculpture and ceramics in the Visual Arts School at the University of Arts of Cuba -ISA, from 2002 to 2012. Among other courses, he taught the Studio Art Practice, as well as the course “The personal project in ceramics”. He also served as a member of the admission committees and thesis committees and was head of the Sculpture Department between 2006 and 2011. Furthermore, he taught the Live Modeling in Clay course at The Royal University College of Arts (KKH), Stockholm, Sweden, in 2007, and the summer class Large-scale Ceramic Sculptures at the University of Mary Washington,Virginia, USA, 2011. He has done demonstrations on the Portrait in Clay in different universities in the USA, such as the Midwestern State University, Texas in 2011.

Visiting artist 
 Visiting artist. Florida International University, Miami, FL. 2015
 Visiting artist. University of Miami, Coral Gables, FL. 2014
 Visiting artist. University of Southern California, Los Angeles, CA. 2013
 Visiting artist. East Los Angeles College, Los Angeles, CA. 2013
 Artist in Residence. Midwestern State University, Wichita Falls, TX. 2012
 Arizona State University, Tempe, Arizona, USA. 2011
 Midwestern State University, Texas, USA. 2011
 University of Mary Washington, Virginia, USA. 2010
 University of Alabama, Tuscaloosa, USA. 2010
 Royal University College of Arts (KKH). Stockholm, Sweden, 2007

Awards / Honors 

 Official Proclamation issued by the Mayor of Miami-Dade County and the Board of County Commissioners declaring Carlos Enrique Prado Day, in honor of his numerous public art projects, 2022.
 Recognition (Reconocimiento). Biennial of Cuban Contemporary Ceramics. The National Museum of the Cuban Contemporary Ceramics, 2022.   
 Second Prize of installation in the Biennial of Ceramics "The Vessel". National Museum of Ceramics in Havana, 2007.
 Third Prize in VIII Biennial of Ceramics "Amelia Pelaez". National Museum of the Ceramics in Havana, 2006.
 Mention awarded in VII Biennial of Ceramics "Amelia Pelaez". National Museum of the Ceramics in Havana, 2004.
 Prize of the International Triennial of Ceramics Elit-Tile. Museum of Modern Arts in Santo Domingo. The Dominican Republic, 2003.
 Sculpture Prize in the Salon de la Academia 1996, International Event of Schools of Arts. San Alejandro National Academy of Fine Arts, Cuba, 1996.

Work in Public Places 

2022
 Serafin Sanchez Valdivia Monument. General Serafin Sanchez Park, 4225 SW 92nd Ave, Olympia Heights, Florida 33165. Commissioned by Miami-Dade County, Art in Public Places. 
 Rogelio Gonzalez Corzo “Francisco” Monument. Francisco Human Rights Park, 9445 Coral Way, Miami, Florida 33156. Commissioned by Miami-Dade County, Art in Public Places.
2020
 Rising Above the Horizon. Medley Town Hall Monument. Town Hall Plaza, 7777 NW 72nd Ave, Medley, Florida 33166. Large-scale public sculpture, commissioned by the Town of Medley and Miami-Dade County Art in Public Places.
2018
 A Man and a Horse. President Reagan Equestrian Monument. Tropical Park, 7900 SW 40 St, Miami, Florida 33155. Commissioned by Miami-Dade County Art in Public Places, was unveiled in April 2018.
2009
 Public bench, Sanitary Therapy series. San Pancho Cultural Center. Nayarit. Mexico. Commissioned by San Pancho Cultural Center.
2006
 Portrait Bust of Alicia Alonso. National Museum of Dance, Havana, Cuba. Commissioned by the National Museum of Dance.
2005
 Atlases. National Museum of Ceramics, Havana, Cuba. Commissioned by the National Museum of Ceramics.
2004
 Portrait Bust of Emilio Roig de Leuchsenring. The Museum of the City of La Habana. Havana, Cuba. Commissioned by the Office of the Historian of the City.
2002
 Dulce María Loynáz Monument. Taoro Park, Ctra. Taoro, 7, 38400 Puerto de la Cruz, Santa Cruz de Tenerife, Spain. Commissioned by the City of Puerto de la Cruz, finished on December 12, 2002.

Collections 
Among the most important public collections in which we can find Carlos Enrique's artworks are: Art in Public Places Collection Miami-Dade County, Florida; National Museum of Cuban Contemporary Ceramics, Havana, Cuba; ASU Art Museum - Ceramic Research Center, Arizona; Museum of the Contemporary Ceramics (MCC) in Santo Domingo, Dominican Republic; The City of Puerto de la Cruz, Tenerife, Spain; Museum of Dance, Havana; Museum of the City of Havana, Cuba; Consejo Nacional de Artes Plásticas, Havana, Cuba; Cultural Center Dulce María Loynaz of Havana, Cuba; Elf Genius Art Fundació de Barcelona, Spain; and PanAmerican Arts Projects, Miami, Florida.

He has worked in multiple private collections in Cuba, the USA, Spain, France, Switzerland, Sweden, Germany, Mexico, Dominican Republic, among others.

Solo exhibitions 
2022
 Tautologies. Solo exhibition, 3D printed ceramic sculpture. Kendall Art Cultural Center. Miami, FL.

2010
 Preludio y Fuga (Prelude and fugue –escapes–). Digital prints and installation. Convent of San Francisco de Asis. Havana. The exhibition is part of the Biennial X of Ceramics of Havana.

2009
 El icono escamoteado (The whisked away icon). Sculptures. Hispanic-American Center of Culture. Havana.

2008
 Project Room: Carlos Enrique, recent works. Sculptures and digital prints. Pan-American Art projects. Miami city, USA.
 Terapia sanitaria (Sanitary therapy). Sculptures. The Ludwig Foundation of Cuba. Havana.

2006
 Re-Visiones (Re-visions). Sculptures. National Museum of Contemporary Cuban Ceramics. Havana.
 Todo para llevar (Everything to take). Portable sculptures. Galiano Gallery. Havana.

2005
 Otra forma más de mirar lo mismo (A Different way of looking at the same thing). Digital prints. It was organized by the Contemporary Art Center Wifredo Lam and the Ludwig Foundation of Cuba. Gallery of the Cultural Center ICAIC. Havana.

2002
 Mírate el mundo de otra manera (Look yourself at the world in a different way). Sculptures. La Acacia Gallery in Havana. Graduation exhibition.
 Miradas Posibles (Possible Glances). Sculptures. Miramar Trade Center. Havana.

1996
 Seudoexposición. San Alejandro Academy of Fine Arts. Havana.
 Transfiguración (Transfiguration). Installation with drawings and sculptures. 23rd and 12th Gallery. Havana.

1994
 Almas en pena (Grieving Souls). Drawings. Galiano Gallery. Havana.

1993
 Con mi cruz a cuestas (With my cross on the back). Sculptures and drawings. Carmelo González Gallery, Cultural Center of Vedado. Havana.

1992
 Adolescencia (Adolescence). Sculptures. 23 y 12 Gallery. Havana city.

Selected group exhibitions

2022
 Beyond the Plate / Contemporary Ceramics. The Museum of Arts & Sciences (MOAS), Daytona Beach, FL.
 Visions in Clay, exhibition invitational. NCECA Annual Conference Venue Exhibition. LH Horton Jr Art Gallery, San Joaquin Delta College, Stockton, CA.
 Permanent Collection on Display. Kendall Art Center. Miami, FL.

2021
 Fine Arts on the Plate – The Rodriguez Collection. The Sidney and Berne Davis Art Center, Fort Myers, FL.
 UM Faculty Exhibition. Wynwood Gallery. Miami, FL.
 New Acquisitions, The Rodriguez Collection – Collection Display. Kendall Art Center. Miami, FL.

2020
 Biennial of Ceramics – Sculptures, Installations and Projects-. Organized by the National Museum of Contemporary Cuban Ceramics. Hispanic-American Cultural Center gallery. Havana, Cuba.
 UM Faculty Exhibition. Wynwood Gallery. Miami, FL.
 Alicia en su pais de maravillas. Origenes Gallery. La Habana, Cuba

2019
 UM Faculty Exhibition. Wynwood Gallery. Miami, FL.
 En Retrospectiva: Coleccion del Museo de la Ceramica. Casa del Conde Lombillo Cultural Center. Havana, Cuba.

2018
 Twin Cups: National Ceramic Exhibition 2018. Potter Fine Arts Gallery, Missouri Western State University. St. Joseph, MO.

2017
 Biennial of Ceramics -Murals and Vessels-. Hispanic-American Cultural Center gallery. Havana, Cuba.
 2017 UM Faculty Exhibition. University of Miami Art Gallery at the Wynwood Building. Miami, FL.

2016
 Biennial of Ceramics –Sculptures, Installations and Projects-. Hispanic-American Cultural Center gallery. Havana, Cuba.
 2016 UM Faculty Exhibition. University of Miami Art Gallery at the Wynwood Building. Miami, FL.
 La Escultura Dibujada. Centro Cultural, Hinojosa del Duque, Córdoba, Spain (January).
 La Escultura Dibujada. Monasterio de Santa Clara, Belalcazar, Córdoba, Spain (March).

2015
 Biennial of Ceramics -Murals and Vessels-. Organized by the National Museum of Contemporary Cuban Ceramics. Hispanic-American Cultural Center gallery. Havana, Cuba.

2014
 Two Streets from the Sand. The Wolfsonian-FIU Museum. Miami Beach, FL.
 Annual Faculty Exhibition. CAS Gallery, University of Miami. Coral Gables, FL.

2013
 Biennial of Ceramics -Murals and Vessels-. Organized by the National Museum of Contemporary Cuban Ceramics. Hispanic-American Cultural Center gallery. Havana, Cuba.

2012
 10 for 10 x2: 10th Anniversary New Acquisitions. ASU Art Museum, Ceramics Research Center. Tempe, AZ.
 From the Clay Studio IV. Juanita Harvey Art Gallery, Midwestern State University, Wichita Falls, TX.

2011
 Exhibition in Tribute to the 50 anniversary of the Association of Writers and Artists of Cuba (UNEAC). Acacia Gallery. Havana.
 Exhibition Large-scale ceramic Sculptures. The University of Mary Washington and LibertyTown Arts Workshop Gallery. Fredericksburg, Virginia, USA.
 Biennial of Ceramic “The Mural and the Vessel”. Organized by the National Museum of Ceramic. Hispanic-American Center of Culture. Havana.
 Exhibition Ripped Eyes. House-Museum of Asia. Havana.

2010
 X Biennial of Ceramic of Havana. Convent of San Francisco de Asis. Havana city.

2009
 1st Symposium of Installations of San Pancho. Exhibition Irrational Relation. San Cultural Pancho Center & Residence. Nayarit. Mexico.
 Exhibition Cronos. Contemporary Cuban Art. Gallery La Casona. Havana city.
 CODEMA in the Biennial X of Havana. Space of National CODEMA (Advisory Council for the Development of the Monumental and Environmental Sculpture).
 The Human Body. National Museum of the Ceramic. Havana city.
 Biennial of Ceramic “The Mural and the Vessel”. Organized by the National Museum of Contemporary Cuban Ceramics. Convent of San Franciscode Asis. Havana city.

2008
 The 13th Annual Los Angeles Art Show. Santa Monica Air Center. Santa Monica city, CA, USA.
 ArtMadrid 2008, Modern and Contemporary Art Hall. Country House of Madrid. Spain.
 IX Biennial of Ceramics (sculpture and installations). Organized by the National Museum of Contemporary Cuban Ceramics. White Room Gallery of The San Francisco de Asis Convent. Havana city.

2007
 Biennial of Ceramics "The Mural and the Vessel". Organized by the National Museum of Contemporary Cuban Ceramics. San Francisco de Asis Convent . Havana City.
 Exhibition Gracias por el fuego (Thank you for the fire), Cuban contemporary ceramics. Villa Manuela Gallery, National Association of Writers and Artists of Cuba (UNEAC). Havana City.
 ArtMadrid 2007. Modern and Contemporary Art Hall. House of Field of Madrid. Spain.
 Exhibition Visiones de un Mundo de Aromas( Visions from a world of Aromas). Havana City Convention Center.

2006
 International Triennial of Ceramics Elit-Tile. Museum of Modern Arts in Santo Domingo. The Dominican Republic.
 VIII International Digital Art Hall. Cultural Center Pablo de la Torriente Brau. Havana City.
 VIII Biennial of Ceramics “Amelia Peláez”, organized by the National Museum of Contemporary Cuban Ceramics. San Francisco de Asis Convent. Havana City.
 Exhibition Taller Abierto (Open Workshop). National CODEMA. Collateral Event at IX Biennial of Havana.
 Exhibition. La ciudad otra – el hombre otro (The other city – another man). Hispanic-American Center of Culture. Collateral Event at IX Biennial of Havana.
 ArtMadrid Modern and Contemporary Art Hall. Country House of Madrid. Spain.
 Exhibition H2Oro. Gallery of the House of the Poetry. Havana City

2005
 Exhibition of Contemporary Cuban Sculpture, organized by National CODEMA (Advisory Council for the Development of the Monumental and Environmental Sculpture) for the International Event "Culture and Development" at the Convention Center in Havana City.
 Biennial of Ceramics "The Vessel". Organized by the National Museum of Ceramics. Fifth Cloister Gallery of the San Francisco de Asis Convent. Havana City.

2004
 VII Biennial of Ceramics “Amelia Peláez”, organized by the National Museum of Ceramics. White Room Gallery of the Convent of San Francisco de Asis. Havana

City.
 Exhibition Lo Clásico (The Classic Thing), Cuban contemporary ceramics. Hispanic-American Center of Culture. Havana city.

2003
 Exhibition Bosque (Forest). Collateral Event to VIII Biennial of the Havana. National Museum of Ceramics. Havana City.
 Exhibition “Without Title. The object in the Cuban contemporary sculpture”. Arts and Literature School at the University of Havana City.
 Exhibition of the Higher Institute of Art in the Culture Pavilion of the Expocuba International fair.
 Exhibition to celebrate a Dance Opening called: El violín descalzo at the Gran Teatro de la Habana City.

2002
 Biennial of Ceramics "The Vessel". National Museum of Contemporary Cuban Ceramics, Castillo de la Real Fuerza. Havana City.
 Fair of Independent Art of Madrid (FAIM). House of Field of Madrid. Spain.
 International Triennial of Ceramics Elit-Tile. Museum of Modern Arts in Santo Domingo. The Dominican Republic.
 Exhibition REMAKE. Arts and Literature School at the University of Havana.

Lectures 
 Overview of his work and Cuban ceramics. The Ceramics Research Center at the ASU Art Museum. Arizona State University, Arizona, USA. 2011.
 Lecture about his personal work. Midwestern State University, Texas, USA. 2011.
 A ceramist talks about a ceramist. Presentation of the personal artwork. National Museum of Ceramic. Havana. 2011.
 Carlos Enrique artwork. Presentation on his personal work and the story of his professional development as an artist. Department of Arts and Art History. University of Mary Washington. Fredericksburg, Virginia, USA. 2010.
 The State of Ceramic Art in Cuba. Bryant Conference Center Auditorium. The University of Alabama. Tuscaloosa, USA, 2010.
 The Cuban Contemporary Artistic Ceramic. College of Arts and Science, Department of Modern Languages and Classics. The University of Alabama. Tuscaloosa, USA, 2010.
 The ceramic program at the University of Arts of Cuba. College of Arts and Science, Department of Art & Art History. Tuscaloosa, USA. 2010.
 Contemporary artistic projects in ceramic. Appreciation course on the development of the artistic ceramic in Cuba. Ceramic workshop, Mirta García Buch, Havana. 2009.
 Sculpture in ceramic. Evident strategies from the sculpture workshop of the ISA. Professional school of Plastic arts, Island of the Youth. 2008.
 Sanitary meditation. Presentation of the thesis in option to the grade of Master in Art. Ludwig Foundation of Cuba, Havana. 2008.
 The ceramic workshop of the ISA, an alternative for the sculpture in Cuba. The Royal University College of Fine Arts (KKH). Stockholm, Sweden. 2007.
 The creator and his work. An artist's history about how he became a"professional". A series of lectures developed at the VIII Biennial of Ceramic "Amelia Peláez" in the San Francisco de Asis Convent. Havana City, 2006.
 The teaching of ceramics in the Higher Institute of Art, developed at the San Francisco de Asis Convent. Havana City, 2005.
 The experimentation in ceramics. Presentation of the Barro Espiritual Project, in the National Museum of Ceramics. Havana City, 2002.
 Round table on the sculpture in Cuba. Points of view of creators from the different generations at the Arts and Literature School of the University of Havana City, 1999.
 The fine Arts creators within the digital world. 2nd meeting of specialists in Virtual Reality. Mass Media and Communication School. Higher Institute of Arts, 1998.

Bibliography 
 Alberdi, Virginia: “Otro Carlos Enrique: retrato de un artista adolescente”, revista Artecubano, No. 2, La Habana, 1995, pp. 42-45.
 Alberdi, Virginia: “Ni inocente ni neutral”, Granma newspaper, No 207 – año 41, La Habana, miércoles 31 de agosto de 2005.
 Alberdi, Virginia: “Carlos Enrique Prado: Ni inocente ni neutral”, Cubarte, portal de la cultura cubana. Noticias, 3 de septiembre de 2005.
 Alonso, Alejandro G.: The Collection of the National Museum of Contemporary Cuban Ceramics. Ediciones Boloña. , La Habana, 2020, pp. 12, 20, 22, 28, 176, 177.
 Alonso, Alejandro G.: Todo para llevar (cat.), Galería Galiano, La Habana, agosto, 2006.
 Alonso, Alejandro G.: Re-visiones (cat.), Museo Nacional de la Cerámica, La Habana, 2006.
 Alonso, Alejandro G.: “X Bienal de Cerámica” (Una exposición personal), revista Artecubano, No 2, La Habana, 2010, pp 53.
 "Arte Cubano Contemporaneo. Coleccion del Consejo Nacional de Artes Plasticas", ArteCubano Ediciones, 2014, pg 266-267.
 Barreto, Emilio: “Prado transfigurado”, revista Cartelera Cultural, no. 64, La Habana, 1996.
 Branscome, Jeff: “From Cuba to US: Clay connection”. The Free Lance-Star newspaper, Fredericksburg City, VA, USA. August 4, 2011.
 Calvo, Onedys: “El ceramista escultor: Carlos Enrique, el artista”, revista Revolución y Cultura, no. 5-6, año 2009, pp. 59-65
 Castellanos, Israel: “La taza sanitaria emplaza”, revista digital La Jiribilla, No 223, La Habana 2005.
 Jubrias, Maria Elena: La Ceramica Cubana, entre el moderno y el posmoderno. [The Cuban Ceramics, Between Modern and Postmodern.] (in Spanish). Ediciones Boloña. , La Habana, 2017, pp. 101, 106, 107, 135, 137, 150.
 Lopez, Odette: Tautologies: Carlos Enrique Prado. Kendall Art Cultural Center. . Miami, FL, 2022.
 Lopez, Odette: “Classical Columns, Stacks, and Piles.” Ceramics Now digital magazine, ceramicsnow.org, July 2, 2022.
 Lopez, Odette: “Tautologies: Carlos Enrique Prado.” Artepoli magazine. ISSN – Versión Impresa: 2385 – 7919. Spain, 2022, (in Spanish).
 Miami Unveils a Statue in Honor of Former President Ronald Reagan. The Sun Post News, Miami, April 16, 2018.
 Montoya, Kelly: “Students sculptures are a reflection of themselves.” The News@TheU. The University of Miami, FL, October 26th, 2020.
 Noceda Fernández, José Manuel: “Carlos Enrique Prado: con un mirar diferente”, revista La Gaceta de Cuba, no. 3, La Habana, mayo-junio, 2006, pp. 46-48.
 Noceda Fernández, José Manuel: “Carlos Enrique Prado: La ritualidad del objeto”, Otra forma más de mirar lo mismo (cat.), Centro Cultural ICAIC, La Habana, julio, 2005.
 Pereira, María de los Ángeles: “Descubrir lo sublime”, Mírate el mundo de otra manera (cat.), Galería La Acacia, La Habana, junio, 2002.
 Pereira, María de los Ángeles: “Carlos Enrique, escultor”, revista Artecubano, no 2-3, La Habana, 2003, pp 48-51.
 Perez, Amanda M.: “Instructor sculpts the next generation of artists.” The News@TheU. The University of Miami, FL, January 27th, 2022.
 Prado, Carlos: “Process”, Sights & Ceramics: Pittsburgh, Ceramics Monthly special NCECA Guide. Copyright @ 2018, The American Ceramic Society, All Rights Reserved. March 2018, pp 44, 43.
 Prado Herrera, Carlos Enrique: “Terapia Sanitaria. Apuntes colaterales”, revista Noticias de Artecubano, no 8 año 9, La Habana, agosto de 2008, pp 7.
 Prado Herrera, Carlos Enrique: Transfiguración (cat.), Centro de arte 23 y 12, La Habana, 1996.
 Prado Herrera, Carlos Enrique: Todo para llevar (cat.), Galería Galiano, La Habana, 2006.
 Reyes Cruz, Alain: “Aquí y allá. A propósito de la exposición personal Todo para llevar de Carlos Enrique Prado, en Galería Galiano”, revista Noticias de Artecubano, no 4 año 7, La Habana, septiembre-octubre de 2006, pp 3.
 Rodríguez, Dianelys: “Todo para llevar”, Portal San Cristóbal de La Habana. Sept de 2006.
 Sánchez Álvarez, Amalia: Almas en pena (cat.), Galería Galiano, La Habana, 1994.
 Sweeten-Shults, Lana: “MSU resident artist: Torsos’ Travelers”. Times Record News newspaper. Wichita Falls, Texas. April 8, 2012.
 Vasallo, María del Carmen: “Todo para llevar”, portal web Cubasí.cu, 28-08-2006.
 Veigas Zamora, José: “La escultura en Cuba. Siglo XX”, Fundación Caguayo y Editorial Oriente, Santiago de Cuba, 2005, pp. 346-348.
 Williams, Ashley A: “University fine arts students display work at local gallery.” The News@TheU. The University of Miami, FL, June 22, 2022.

References

External links 

 carlospradoart.com – Official Site
 carlosenriqueprado.blogspot.com: News-Blog

News 
 Miami-Dade County News Release
 MIAMI UNVEILS A STATUE IN HONOR OF FORMER PRESIDENT RONALD REAGAN
 Miami-Dade Minute – Ronald Reagan Sculpture Unveiling
 Miami desvela una estatua en honor al expresidente Ronald Reagan
 Visiting Arist: Carlos Enrique Prado Herrera
 Cuban Sculptor Working With Students
 Large Scale Ceramics
 “Instructor sculpts the next generation of artists.” The University of Miami
 “Classical Columns, Stacks, and Piles.” Ceramics Now

Cuban contemporary artists
Cuban artists
Cuban sculptors
21st-century sculptors
1978 births
Living people
Artists from Havana
Instituto Superior de Arte alumni
Academic staff of the Instituto Superior de Arte
University of Miami faculty